The silver roughy or Mediterranean slimehead (Hoplostethus mediterraneus) is a small deep-sea fish species belonging to the slimehead family (Trachichthyidae). It is also found in the Western Indian Ocean, including the Red Sea.

References

External links

silver roughy
Fish of the Mediterranean Sea
Fish of the Atlantic Ocean
Fish of the Indian Ocean
silver roughy
silver roughy